Sandeep Parmar is a contemporary poet, who was born in Nottingham, England, and raised in Southern California. She currently lives in the UK. Parmar is a Professor of English Literature at the University of Liverpool.

Her poetry collections include The Marble Orchard (Shearsman 2012) and Eidolon (Shearsman 2015). She is also the author of Reading Mina Loy's Autobiographies: Myth of the Modern Woman (Bloomsbury 2013), and the editor of The Collected Poems of Hope Mirrlees (Carcanet 2011) and Nancy Cunard's Selected Poems (Carcanet 2016).

See also 
 British Poetry Revival
 Nancy Cunard
 Hope Mirrlees
 Mina Loy

External links 
 Review of The Marble Orchard at Fortnightly Review
 Review of The Marble Orchard at The Guardian
 Review of Eidolon at Dundee University Review of the Arts
 Review of Eidolon at Stride Magazine
 Review of Eidolon at Mascara Literary Review
 Two poems by Parmar at Blackbox Manifold
 Poem recordings at The Poetry Archive
 Poems recordings at Archive of the Now
 Video recording of collaboration with James Byrne
 'Not a British Subject: Race and Poetry in the UK'
 Further publications by Sandeep Parmar

References

1979 births
21st-century British poets
English-language poets
British women poets
Living people
21st-century British women writers
British writers of Indian descent